Bouthayna Al-Muftah (born 1987) is a Qatari artist.

Early life and education
Al-Muftah was born in Qatar in 1987. She holds a Bachelor of Arts from Virginia Commonwealth University School of the Arts in Qatar (2010).

Career
After graduating from VCUarts, Al Muftah specialized in printmaking, typography and drawing. She created several mixed media installations.

In 2014, her works were included in a group exhibition  at the Qatar Museums Gallery - Al Riwaq exhibition Here, There under the title Um Alsalsil Will Thahab, which means "Mother of Chains and Gold".

In 2017, her art works featured at "Contemporary Art Qatar" in Berlin.

In 2018, she presented her art exhibition Bouthayna Al-Muftah: Echoes at Mathaf: Arab Museum of Modern Art.

On 15 June 2022, the Cité international de la Tapisserie in Aubusson held a ceremony to unveil the tapestry bring them back, inspired by the works of Al Muftah.

Bouthayna is the official poster artist for the 2022 FIFA World Cup. In June 2022, she unveiled her poster at Hamad International Airport in Doha. A total of eight posters are produced to represent Qatar's passion for soccer. The main poster shows a traditional Qatari headdress "gutra" being thrown in the air, as a symbol of the celebrations and soccer enthusiasm in the Arab world.

In July 2022, she unveiled her poster at the Design Museum in London as part of the exhibition "Football: Designing the Beautiful Game". Also present at the unveiling was the official ambassador of the 2022 FIFA World Cup Qatar, David Beckham.

References

1987 births
Living people
Qatari artists